María del Rosario Guerra de La Espriella is a Colombian economist, professor and politician who has served as Senator since 2014. She was elected  under a newly created political party, the Democratic Center, which is led by former Colombian President Alvaro Uribe. Guerra was the Minister of Communications under President Uribe from July 2006 until January 2010. In March 2017, Guerra announced her candidacy for President of Colombia.

Career
Guerra is an economist from Del Rosario University. She also received a Masters in Public Administration from Harvard University and a Masters in Agricultural Economy from Cornell University. She is a professor at Del Rosario University, University of the Andes and the National University of Colombia. Guerra had previously held roles as Vice Chancellor of Del Rosario University and also served as Director of the Administrative Department of Science, Technology and Innovation - Colciencias.

She was appointed Minister of Communications during the second term of President Alvaro Uribe. One of her main contributions was to implement the Law of Technologies of Information and Communication, TIC (Law 1341 of 2009), Law on the Services Postcards (Law 1369 of 2009) and led programs to expand internet access to marginalised regions of Colombia by expanding the Digital Citizen initiative.

Political career 
In March 2014, she was elected Senator of the Republic for the period 2014–2018 under the Democratic Center, a political movement created and led by Uribe. Guerra became the de facto deputy leader of the Democratic Center in the Senate behind Uribe, who was also elected Senator. In March 2017, Guerra launched a bid for her party's nomination for the 2018 presidential election, but withdrew her name in November.

She was reelected as senator of Colombia for the period 2018-2022. She is part of the economic commission of the Senate and also the decentralization commission. She is the coordinator of the pro life commission in the Senate and the commission for combating hunger and malnutrition.

References 

1961 births
Living people
Cornell University College of Agriculture and Life Sciences alumni
Colombian economists
Members of the Senate of Colombia
Ministers of Information Technologies and Communications (Colombia)
Harvard Kennedy School alumni
Women government ministers of Colombia
Del Rosario University alumni
People from Sincelejo